Dolenje Polje is a settlement on the left bank of the Krka River in the Municipality of Dolenjske Toplice in Slovenia. The area is part of the historical region of Lower Carniola. The municipality is now included in the Southeast Slovenia Statistical Region.

References

External links
Dolenje Polje on Geopedia

Populated places in the Municipality of Dolenjske Toplice